Dampiera dysantha, the shrubby dampiera, is an undershrub in the family Goodeniaceae. The species grows to 70 cm high The flowers are blue, or occasionally white to lilac and are covered  on the outside with grey and rusty hairs. These generally appear between September and October in its native range.

The species was first formally described as a variety of Dampiera rosmarinifolia  by English botanist George Bentham in Flora Australiensis in 1868.

References

dysantha
Flora of South Australia
Flora of Victoria (Australia)
Endemic flora of Australia
Plants described in 1868